Andrew Kirk may refer to:

Andrew Jackson Kirk (1866–1933), U.S. Representative from Kentucky
Andrew Kirk (rugby league) (born 1982), English professional rugby league footballer
Andy Kirk (musician) (1898–1992), jazz musician
Andy Kirk (footballer) (born 1979), Northern Irish association football player
Andy Kirk (soccer) (born 1977), American association football player
Drew Kirk, fictional character in the Australian soap opera Neighbours